Galesburg is a city in Kalamazoo County in the U.S. state of Michigan. The population was 2,009 at the 2010 census.

Galesburg is located along the north side of the Kalamazoo River.

For statistical purposes, the Census Bureau has defined Greater Galesburg as a census-designated place consisting of the urbanized area outside the city's municipal boundaries.

History
Galesburg was established in 1835 originally with the name Morton. It was platted in 1837 when it was given its current name and incorporated as a village in 1861 and as a city in 1931. Galesburg is named for George L. Gale, an early settler.

Geography

Demographics

2010 census
As of the census of 2010, there were 2,009 people, 766 households, and 497 families residing in the city. The racial makeup of the city was 93.5% White, 2.4% African American, 0.5% Native American, 0.3% Asian, 0.5% from other races, and 2.6% from two or more races. Hispanic or Latino of any race were 2.4% of the population.

There were 766 households, of which 36.0% had children under the age of 18 living with them, 38.9% were married couples living together, 19.1% had a female householder with no husband present, 6.9% had a male householder with no wife present, and 35.1% were non-families. 27.8% of all households were made up of individuals, and 6.4% had someone living alone who was 65 years of age or older. The average household size was 2.47 and the average family size was 2.98.

The median age in the city was 35.6 years. 25.8% of residents were under the age of 18; 8.8% were between the ages of 18 and 24; 27.6% were from 25 to 44; 25.4% were from 45 to 64; and 12.4% were 65 years of age or older. The gender makeup of the city was 47.3% male and 52.7% female.

2000 census
As of the census of 2000, there were 1,988 people, 765 households, and 491 families residing in the city. The racial makeup of the city was 96.38% White, 0.96% African American, 0.91% Native American, 0.15% Asian, 0.20% from other races, and 1.41% from two or more races. Hispanic or Latino of any race were 1.16% of the population.

There were 765 households, out of which 37.0% had children under the age of 18 living with them, 41.4% were married couples living together, 17.6% had a female householder with no husband present, and 35.8% were non-families. 28.4% of all households were made up of individuals, and 8.2% had someone living alone who was 65 years of age or older. The average household size was 2.46 and the average family size was 2.98.

In the city, the population was spread out, with 27.3% under the age of 18, 11.0% from 18 to 24, 30.4% from 25 to 44, 18.6% from 45 to 64, and 12.7% who were 65 years of age or older. The median age was 33 years. For every 100 females, there were 98.6 males. For every 100 females age 18 and over, there were 91.5 males.

The median income for a household in the city was $34,663, and the median income for a family was $44,038. Males had a median income of $35,167 versus $24,886 for females. The per capita income for the city was $16,785. About 11.0% of families and 12.9% of the population were below the poverty line, including 19.1% of those under age 18 and 5.0% of those age 65 or over.

Notable person
William Rufus Shafter, United States military officer

Schools
In 1951, members of the Galesburg community and those of neighboring Augusta joined to form a public school district.  Galesburg-Augusta Community Schools currently consist of a primary school and a high school in Galesburg, and a middle school in Augusta.

References

External links
Galesburg, Michigan Website

Cities in Kalamazoo County, Michigan
Kalamazoo–Portage metropolitan area
1835 establishments in Michigan Territory
Populated places established in 1835